Justin Best (born August 17, 1997) is an American rower. He competed in the men's eight event at the 2020 Summer Olympics.

When he was in middle school, Best suffered a concussion playing football that caused him to reconsider his athletic activities. After seeing The Social Network his parents were inspired by the Harvard rowing team scenes and he started rowing for the Newport Rowing Club. He continued rowing while at Unionville High School in Kennett Square, Pennsylvania, where he was part of an effort to petition the local school board to add rowing as a club sport. In 2015, he was part of the men's eight that won a silver medal at the World Rowing Junior Championships. 

Best attended Drexel University, where he studied business and engineering. While competing for the Drexel Dragons, they won the Dad Vail Regatta team title all four years. During his time at Drexel he also competed for the US National U23 squad in 2018 and 2019. After being selected in 2020, he competed in the one year delayed men's eight event at the 2020 Summer Olympics. After graduating, he worked as an investment analyst.

References

External links
 
 Drexel Dragons bio

1997 births
Living people
American male rowers
Olympic rowers of the United States
Rowers at the 2020 Summer Olympics
Drexel Dragons rowers
People from Kennett Square, Pennsylvania
20th-century American people
21st-century American people